The rufous scrubbird (Atrichornis rufescens) is a bird species in the family Atrichornithidae. It is endemic to Australia.

Taxonomy
One of two species of Atrichornis, known as scrubbirds, the only extant populations of the Atrichornithidae family; the noisy scrubbird Atrichornis clamosus is restricted to a small population in western Australia.

Two subspecies are recognized: the nominate Atrichornis rufescens rufescens, and A. rufescens ferrieri.

The description of a new species by Edward Pierson Ramsay, Atrichia rufescens, was published in 1867 in the Proceedings of the Zoological Society of London (1866). Ramsay purchased two male specimens from T. MacGillivray and compared them with a previously described species from the southwest of Australia. The collector J. F. Wilcox shot these specimens in dense vegetation along the edge of Bowling Creek, near the Richmond River in New South Wales, noting the great difficulty in obtaining them. The epithet rufescens was proposed for the rufous tint of the plumage that distinguished it from the western scrubbird, named by John Gould as Atrichia clamosa.

Description 
Both sexes are brown with a rufous breast and a lightly barred back. The male has a long white streak on both sides on his neck and noticeable white edging on his throat. The female has a lighter breast and lacks the white edging.

Distribution and habitat
The species occurs only in isolated locations in north-eastern New South Wales and south-eastern Queensland. It requires dense ground cover and deep leaf-litter in rainforest and wet eucalypt forest, at elevations above 600 m, where it forages on snails and insects on the ground.

Conservation
By the mid-20th century, it was almost extinct. A subsequent recovery to Near Threatened status in 2004 was followed by successive uplisting to Vulnerable and Endangered status in 2008 and 2012 respectively, in consideration of the fragmented status and small size of remaining habitats. Total population size was estimated at a low of ~2,500 pairs in the 1980s, but is currently estimated at 12,000 pairs.

Most of the early decline is believed to have been driven by the clearance of the species' lowland habitats, and logging practices are implicated in current declines, together with natural aging (and consequent disappearance of understorey) of remaining eucalypt stands.

References

External links
BirdLife Species Factsheet.
Image at ADW

rufous scrubbird
rufous scrubbird
Birds of Queensland
Birds of New South Wales
Endemic birds of Australia
rufous scrubbird